Gainjeonmokdan is a Korean court dance (called jeongjae 정재 in Korean), and literally means "beautiful people plucking peonies". This jeongjae was initiated and arranged by Hyomyeong Seja (Crown Prince Hyomyeong) in 1829 to please his father, King Sunjo. Gainjeonmokdan was first recorded in Mujajinjak uiqwe (무자진작의궤) in 1828. 

In performance, peonies in a large vase for a prop are placed in the center of the stage, and then female dancers from divided two groups anticipate the flowers as moving around the vase. Dancers pick a peony one by one, and then dance in a calm movement.

Changsa
Changsa (창사 唱詞) is  verses of the accompanying song for dance or other performing arts. It is used for gainjeonmokdan

See also

Korean dance
Seungjeonmu
Geommu

References

External links
  Information about Gain jeon mokdan from empas Encyclopedia
  Information about Gain jeon mokdan

Korean dance